The Josef Sudek Studio is a gallery bearing the name of the renowned Czech photographer Josef Sudek. This single-storey pavilion of only 61 square metres and located in the courtyard of the apartment buildings at no. 432 Újezd, Prague, is a replica of the original that Sudek used from 1927 to 1976. In 1990, the studio was listed as a national heritage site.

Studio
This is the last existing example of this kind of photography studio built at the end of the nineteenth century. It was moved here in 1901 from what would later become the Prague district of Vinohrady. This kind of building was erected in the second half of the nineteenth century thanks to the boom in commercial and art photography. It is a unique piece of the national heritage not only in Prague, but in the whole Czech Republic.

For Sudek the studio was not merely a place to work. It was also a source of inspiration and a frequent subject of his art photography. He photographed it at all times of the day and night and in every season, inside and outside, together with the neglected garden, particularly the strangely twisted tree in front of his now famous studio window.

In 1985, a fire broke out in the studio, destroying the already derelict space. What remained after the firefighters had put out the blaze was unusable. The only solution was to make an exact replica of the original.

A partner on the project and an investor in the construction and subsequent operation of the replica studio was PPF Art, part of the PPF Group investment company. The replica studio was built in 2000 under the aegis of the then mayor of Prague, Jan Kasl, with the participation of the photography historian Anna Fárová, the Borough of Prague 1, the Museum of Decorative Arts in Prague, CMC Architects, Květinový servis, Konstruktiva Branko, Terra Floridus, and Gema Art.

PPF Art operates several art galleries and is the curator of unique collections, including Czech and Slovak photography. The basis of the photography collection is the photographs of Josef Sudek, including a set of photographs salvaged from his burnt-out studio. In addition to the Josef Sudek Studio, PPF Art also operates The Václav Špála Gallery and is the curator of a collection of paintings (and other works of art), which provides a cross-section of Czech painting from the late nineteenth century to the present.

Exhibitions

2001 
 Josef Sudek II
 Gabina Fárová
 Emila Medková
 František Drtikol
 Josef Sudek I

2002 
 Ivan Pinkava – TNF
 Miro Švolík – Openings and Holes

2004 
 Josef Sudek – Dance
 Alexandr Hackenschmied – Prague / Paris / New York

2005 
 Michal Kalhous – Kladky
 Antonín Kratochvíl – USSA

2006 
 Tereza Sochorová – Writing Reaches Very Far …
 Jiří Kovanda – I'd Rather Be an Angel
 Alexandra Vajd – Untitled 2003
 Václav Stratil – Pairs

2007 
 Jolana Havelková – Landscape 06
 Josef Sudek – Privatissima – Notes from the 1950s to the 1970s

2008 
 Josef Sudek – Privatissima – Nocturno

2010 
 Václav Jirásek – UPSYCH 316a

2011 
 Jan Svoboda – Svoboda’s Legacy
 Štěpánka Šimlová – I Love You, But …
 Josef Sudek – Sudek Reprises
 Dušan Tománek – The Process

2012 
 Ivo Přeček – Ivo Přeček
 Tereza Příhodová – Lessons of Solitude
 Ladislav Babuščák – Late Autumn/Early Winter
 From the PPF Art Collection – Twilight in the Rothmayers’ Garden
 Štěpánka Stein and Salim Issa – National Awakening 
 Viktor Kopasz – /City.zen/

2013 
 Tomáš Pospěch – Curatorial Work / Reloaded
 Michal Ureš – Below the View Through
 Jan Jindra – Inner Landscapes
 Michal Šeba – Nocturnalia
 From the PPF Art Collection – Pictorialists
 Adéla Leinweberová – Cancelled Stop
 Fotograf Festival – Jiří Valoch and Lenka Vítková – Range
 Andreas Wegner – Cabinet

2014 
 Jan Tesař – Books and Other Pictures
 Michal Czanderle – Photographs of War, Pt 2
 Libuše Jarcovjáková and Veronika Nastoupilová – Ziellos
 Jiří Thýn – Basic Studies of Non-narrative Photography
 From the PPF Art Collection – The Charm of the Still Life
 Alexander Dobrovodský – Quicksilver Rains
 Fotograf festival – Anna Orlowská – Case Study: Invisibility
 Kateřina Zahradníčková – Island

2015 
 Jiří Černický – Real Minimalism
 Tereza Havlinková – I Can Take Your Photograph
 Waanja (Radek Váňa) and Jiří Kovanda – mine mine not yours!
 From the PPF Art Collections – Josef Sudek and Jan Svoboda – A Comparison II
 Tomáš Hrůza – Way Out
 Jan Svoboda – Reconstruction I: The Collection of Jan Svoboda

See also
Josef Sudek Gallery
4176 Sudek (asteroid name for him)

References

Photographic studios
Museums in Prague
Art museums and galleries in the Czech Republic
Photography companies of the Czech Republic